Emirhan Ergün (born 18 February 1990) is a Turkish professional football player. Ergün plays as a goalkeeper for Derincespor.

External links

1990 births
Living people
People from Bakırköy
Association football goalkeepers
Turkish footballers
Turkey youth international footballers
Galatasaray A2 footballers
Galatasaray S.K. footballers
Footballers from Istanbul
21st-century Turkish people